Resonance is a live album by jazz guitarist Joe Pass, recorded in 1974 and released posthumously in 2000. It was recorded during the same performances as Live at Donte's.

Reception
Jim Ferguson (JazzTimes) wrote in his review of Resonance: "...the mercurial Pass turns tunes like "It Could Happen to You" (often given a ballad treatment) and Jobim's "Corcovado" into rousing, near-frantic tour de forces, where he establishes a brisk tempo and proceeds to tattoo variation after variation. He does eventually settle down, however, to play sweet and smooth on "Too Late Now" and "Misty," each of which features Pass' unmistakable combination of smooth single-note lines and silken chordal passages....Another look back at a brilliant performance from one of jazz's most unforgettable players."

Track listing

Personnel
 Joe Pass – guitar
 Jim Hughart – electric bass
 Frank Severino – drums

References

Joe Pass live albums
Live albums published posthumously
2000 live albums
Pablo Records live albums